Susan Langdon is the CEO of the Toronto Fashion Incubator (TFI).

Career

Langdon attended Ryerson University and completed the Fashion Design program. During the 1980s, she launched a line of clothes with the help of a financial backer. Sales reached $500,000 in her first year of activity. Langdon is the chief executive of the Toronto Fashion Incubator since 1994 where she has mentored many Canadian fashion designers, including David Dixon, Sunny Fong of Project Runway Canada, Joeffer Caoc, Sid Neigum, Foxy Originals, Jenny Bird, Arthur Mendonça, Laura Siegel, Line Knitwear and Smythe.

Awards

 1996: City of Toronto Excellence in Fashion Industry Achievement Award
 1998: Ryerson University's Alumni Award of Distinction and inducted into the university's hall of fame
 2005: JoAnna Townsend Award from the Organization of Women in International Trade
 2021: Order of Canada for her services to Canadian fashion
 Woolmark Award of Distinction and Concours Design Award

References

Canadian women chief executives
Living people
Year of birth missing (living people)
Canadian businesspeople in fashion
Toronto Metropolitan University alumni